The discography of the South Korean boy group Winner consists of four studio albums, four extended plays, three single albums, and twelve singles.

Albums

Studio albums

Compilation albums

Live albums

Single albums

Extended plays

Singles

Other charted songs

Videography

Video albums

Music videos

See also 
Individual discographies

 Song Mino

Notes

References 

Discographies of South Korean artists
Discography
K-pop music group discographies